Heinrich Vieter was a German Pallottine missionary to the German colony of Kamerun. Vieter arrived in Douala with seven other members of the mission on 25 October 1890. Over the next 13 years, Vieter led the Pallottines as they opened missions and schools across the territory. He befriended the young Ntsama Atangana at the mission school in Kribi; Atangana would later gift the Pallottines with land in Jaunde. When a Bulu leader Martin-Paul Samba was sentenced to death for treason against Germany in 1914, Vieter appealed for a stay, but his requests were ignored.

Notes

References
 DeLancey, Mark W., and DeLancey, Mark Dike (2000): Historical Dictionary of the Republic of Cameroon (3rd ed.). Lanham, Maryland: The Scarecrow Press.
 Nde, Paul. "Ntsama, Charles Atangana". The Dictionary of African Christian Biography. Accessed 30 October 2006.
 Ngoh, Victor Julius (1996): History of Cameroon Since 1800. Limbe: Presbook.

German colonial people in Kamerun
Roman Catholic missionaries in Cameroon
German Roman Catholic missionaries
Pallottines
Year of death missing
German Servants of God
Year of birth missing
German expatriates in Cameroon
Roman Catholic bishops of Yaoundé